Rouhollah Rostami is an Iranian powerlifter.

In 2021, he won the silver medal in his event at the World Para Powerlifting Championships held in Tbilisi, Georgia.

References

External links 
 

Paralympic silver medalists for Iran
Paralympic powerlifters of Iran
Powerlifters at the 2012 Summer Paralympics
Living people
Medalists at the 2012 Summer Paralympics
Year of birth missing (living people)
Paralympic medalists in powerlifting
Medalists at the 2020 Summer Paralympics
Powerlifters at the 2020 Summer Paralympics
Paralympic gold medalists for Iran
21st-century Iranian people